Tetris (or Classic Tetris) is a puzzle video game for the Nintendo Entertainment System (NES) released in 1989, based on Tetris (1984) by Alexey Pajitnov. It is the first official console release of Tetris to have been developed and published by Nintendo. It was preceded by an official Tetris for Family Computer in Japan in December 1988, and an unofficial Tetris by Atari in North America in May 1989.

Gameplay

This version of Tetris has two modes of play: A-Type and B-Type. In A-Type play, the goal is to achieve the highest score. As lines are cleared, the level advances and increases the speed of the falling blocks. At the beginning of a B-Type game, the board starts with randomized obstacle blocks and the goal is to clear 25 lines. In B-Type, the level remains constant, and the player chooses the height of the obstacle beforehand.

During play, the tetriminoes are chosen randomly. This leaves the possibility of extended periods with no long bar pieces, which are essential because tetrises are worth many points more than lesser line clearings. The next piece to fall is shown in a preview window next to the playfield. In a side panel, the game tracks statistics of how many of each tetrimino appeared.

In A-Type, the level advances for every 30 lines cleared, not 10. Each successive level increases the points scored by line clears and changes the colors of the game pieces. Some levels also increase the speed of the falling pieces. Level 29 has tremendous speed, which may end the game almost immediately and is often called the "kill screen", although skilled players can progress. When starting a game, the player can select a starting level from 0 to 19. When starting on a later level, the level is not supposed to advance until as many lines have been cleared as it would have taken to advance from level 0 to the starting level. Due to a bug, the levels will begin advancing earlier than intended when starting on level 11 or higher.

At the end of an A-Type game, a substantial score yields an animated ending of a rocket launch in front of Saint Basil's Cathedral. The size of the rocket depends on the score, ranging from a bottle rocket to the Buran spaceplane. In the best ending, a UFO appears on the launch pad and the cathedral lifts off. After a high-level B-Type game, various Nintendo characters perform in front of the cathedral.

Development

By 1989, about six companies claimed rights to create and distribute the Tetris software for home computers, game consoles, and handheld systems. ELORG, the Soviet bureau that held the ultimate copyright, claimed that none of the companies were legally entitled to produce an arcade version, and signed those rights over to Atari Games. Non-Japanese console and handheld rights were signed over to Nintendo.

Tetris was shown at the January 1988 Consumer Electronics Show in Las Vegas, where it was picked up by Dutch-born American games publisher Henk Rogers, then based in Japan. This eventually led to an agreement brokered with Nintendo where Tetris became a launch game for Game Boy and bundled with every system. The Nintendo home release was developed by Gunpei Yokoi.

The game's code includes an unfinished and inaccessible two-player versus mode, which sends rows of garbage blocks (with one opening) to the bottom of the opponent's board when lines are cleared. This feature may have been scrapped due to a rushed development schedule, or to promote sales of the Game Link Cable which enables a two-player mode in Nintendo's Game Boy Tetris.

Music
The soundtrack was written by Nintendo composer Hirokazu Tanaka, who also scored the Game Boy version. Focusing on Russian classical music, the soundtrack features arrangements of "The Dance of the Sugar Plum Fairy" from Pyotr Ilyich Tchaikovsky's ballet The Nutcracker and the overture from Georges Bizet's opera Carmen. The former replaces the arrangement of "Minuet", present in the Game Boy version, which has become strongly associated with Tetris.

Reception

,  copies of the NES version were sold worldwide.

IGN noted that "almost everyone" regarded Nintendo's Tetris as inferior to Atari's Tetris, which was pulled from shelves due to licensing issues.

Legacy
Tetris & Dr. Mario (1994) features an enhanced remake of Tetris. Tetris Effect: Connected (2020) includes a game mode that simulates Tetris rules and visuals.

Competition
The 1990 Nintendo World Championships were based on A-Type Tetris, Super Mario Bros., and Rad Racer. In each round, contestants were given a total of six minutes to score as much as possible across all three games. As the Tetris score was multiplied 25 times in the final tally, the prevailing strategy was to immediately exit the other two games to spend all available time in Tetris.

In 2009, Harry Hong became the first independently verified person to achieve the maximum score of 999,999 points, known as a max-out score. Earlier plausible but unverified max-out scores were claimed by Thor Aackerlund  and Jonas Neubauer .

Since 2010, the NES version of Tetris has been featured in the annual Classic Tetris World Championship. It has a 1-on-1 competition to score the most points. Specialized cartridges give both competitors the same piece sequence.

Speed techniques
Horizontal tetronimo speed is maximized by rapidly tapping the D-pad at least 10 times per second. Since 2018, the hypertapping technique was heavily utilized in Tetris tournaments. Players flex the bicep until it tremors, while tapping the thumb. This has inspired young people to acquire NES consoles to play Tetris competitively. In contrast to the older player base of past tournaments, every world champion from 2018 to 2021 has been below age 18 who used the hypertapping technique.

In late 2020, the rolling technique was discovered by competitive NES Tetris player Cheez_Fish.  The stationary fingers go above the D-pad and the other hand's fingers are drummed across the back of the controller, pushing the buttons up into the stationary hand. This technique is much faster and not as physically straining as hypertapping. Rolling allows players to move pieces up to 30 times per second, suitable for level 29. Since 2021, rolling has enabled numerous world records and is used in tournaments.

References 

1989 video games
1990 video games
Esports games
Nintendo Entertainment System games
Nintendo games
Tetris
Video games developed in Japan
Single-player video games
Video games scored by Hirokazu Tanaka